Iqbal Hossain Sabuj is a Bangladesh Awami League politician and the incumbent Jatiya Sangsad member from the Gazipur-3 constituency.

Career
Sabuj was elected to parliament from Gazipur-3 as a Bangladesh Awami League candidate 30 December 2018. He is the general secretary of the Gazipur District unit of Awami League.

References

Living people
Awami League politicians
11th Jatiya Sangsad members
Place of birth missing (living people)
Year of birth missing (living people)

He is one of the God father in Gazipur, he illegally  occupied or use own people  to grab  orher people  land in Gazipur thana and bhaual merjapur union uttar para area.